Crystal is a common English language female given name. 
Variant forms of the name include Kristal,  Krystal,  Cristal,  Kristel,  Krystle and Kristol.

It is a 19th-century coinage, derived from crystal, a transparent quartz gemstone, usually colorless, that can be cut to reflect brilliant light, whose name comes from Ancient Greek   "ice". The Greek variant of the name is Crystallia or Krystallia (Κρυσταλλία). The television series Dynasty made the name famous in the 1980s with a character named Krystle.

People 
 Crystal Allen (born 1972), American film actress
 Crystal Bennett (1918–1987), British archaeologist
 Crystal Bernard (born 1961), American singer-songwriter and actress
 Crystal Bowersox (born 1985), American Idol season 9 runner-up
 Crystal Chappell (born 1965), American actress and producer
 Crystal Cox (born 1979), American athlete and contestant on the reality show Survivor: Gabon
 Crystal Eastman (1881–1928), American lawyer
 Crystal Marie Fleming (born 1981), American sociologist and author
 Crystal Gayle (born 1951), American country music singer
 Crystal Harris (born 1986), American glamour model, singer and television personality
 Crystal Hayes (born 1984), American beauty queen
 Crystal Huang (born 1977), American table tennis player
 Crystal Hunt (born 1985), American actress
 Krystal Jung (born 1994), Korean-American singer and actress
 Crystal Kay (born 1986), Japanese singer and songwriter
 Crystal Kelly (born 1986), American basketball player
 Crystal Kiang (born 1990), Taiwanese-American figure skater
 Crystal Langhorne (born 1986), American basketball player
 Crystal Lewis (born 1969), American contemporary Christian/Gospel vocalist, songwriter and author
 Crystal Liu, known as Liu Yifei (born 1987), Chinese-American actress, singer, and model
 Crystal Lowe (born 1981), Canadian actress and model
 Crystal Mangum (born 1978), African-American woman noted for false allegations of rape
 Crystal Poh (1999–2002), three-year-old victim of a 2002 murder case in Singapore
 Crystal Reed (born 1985), American television and film actress
 Crystal Soubrier, née Dunn (born 1992), American footballer
 Crystal Taliefero (born 1963), American multi-instrumentalist and vocalist (Billy Joel band)
 Crystal Waters (born 1961), American dance music singer and songwriter
 Crystal Yi, known as Lee Soo-jung (born 1993), Korean-American singer-songwriter
 Crystal Yu (born 1988), Chinese television, film and stage actress

Fictional characters 
 Crystal the Snow Fairy, from the Rainbow Magic book franchise
 Crystal Winter, the daughter of the Snow King and Queen from the Mattel franchise Ever After High
 Crystal, one of the characters in the manga Pokémon Adventures
 Crystal, from Scooby-Doo and the Alien Invaders

English feminine given names
Feminine given names
Given names derived from gemstones
Given names